The Alliance for Minority Participation (also Louis Stokes Alliances for Minority Participation of LSAMP), is a fellowship program funded by the National Science Foundation.  It is a multilevel academic program intended to help diversify the STEM workforce by starting at the university level. Students participated early in their career, as early as high school until they reach a post-doctoral degree. LSAMP's goal is to significantly increase student participation in Science, Technology, Engineering and Mathematics. Special emphasis is on supporting underrepresented groups in academia. Among them are African-Americans, Alaskan Natives, American Indians, Hispanic Americans, Native Hawaiians, and Native Pacific Islanders. Activities focus on recruitment, retention and enrichment of the student, in this way attempting to reform education practices.

References

National Science Foundation